Soldier Township is a civil township in northeast Shawnee County, Kansas.  Its main purpose is to provide road maintenance and fire protection services to those within the township.

External links
http://www.soldiertownship.org/

Townships in Shawnee County, Kansas
Townships in Kansas